The 1952 FIVB Women's World Championship was the first edition of the tournament, organised by the world's governing body, the FIVB. It was held from 17 to 29 August 1952 in Moscow, Soviet Union.

Teams

Squads

Source:

Bohumila Valaskova
 Libuse Svozilova
 Ruzena Svobodova
 Jindra Hola
 Vera Bochénkova
 Zdenka Cerna
 Emilia Roobova
 Regina Matalikova
 Bozena Lutockova
 Bela Cigrova
 Bronislava Stulcova
 Bronislava Dostálova
 Coach: Miroslav Rovný

Klementyna Celjnik
 Danuta Noszka
 Urszula Figwer
 Krysztyna Hajec
 Aleksandra Kubiakowna
 Halina Ordzechowska
 Halina Tomaszewska
 Katarzyna Welsyng
 Zofia Wojewodzka
 Krysztyna Zakajewska
 Miroslawa Zakrzewska
 Coach: Zigmund Kzcizanowski

Tatiana Bunina
 Aleksandra Tschudina
 Sofia Gorbunova
 Militia Kononova
 Serafirna Kundirenko
 Sinaida Kuskina
 Vera Oserova
 Anna Ponomariova
 Miniona Sakse
 Valentina Sviridova
 Simonina
 Maria Toporkova
 Coach: Valentina Oskolkova

Format
The tournament was played in a single round-robin format, all eight participant teams in a single pool and played each other once.

Results

|}

|}

Final standing

References

External links
 FIVB Results
 Results - todor66
 Results
 Federation Internationale de Volleyball (Archived 2009-07-21)

W
V
FIVB Volleyball Women's World Championship
V
Sports competitions in Moscow
 in the Soviet Union